Rudrapur Assembly constituency may refer to 
 Rudrapur, Uttarakhand Assembly constituency
 Rudrapur, Uttar Pradesh Assembly constituency